The 3rd Parliament of Singapore was a meeting of the Parliament of Singapore. Its first session commenced on 12 October 1972 and was prorogued on 6 December 1974. It commenced its second session on 21 February 1975 and was dissolved on 6 December 1976.

The members of the 3rd Parliament were elected in the 1972 general election. Parliament was controlled by a People's Action Party majority, led by Prime Minister Lee Kuan Yew and his Cabinet. The Speaker was Dr Yeoh Ghim Seng.

Officeholders 

 Speaker: Yeoh Ghim Seng (PAP)
 Deputy Speaker: Tang See Chim (PAP), from 22 November 1972
 Prime Minister: Lee Kuan Yew (PAP)
 Deputy Prime Minister: Goh Keng Swee (PAP), from 1 March 1973
 Leader of the House: Edmund W. Barker (PAP)
 Party Whip of the People's Action Party: Sia Kah Hui

Composition

Members 
This is the list of members of the 3rd Parliament of Singapore elected in the 1972 general election.

References

Parliament of Singapore